Loren Ligorio (born 9 June 1955) is a Croatian painter, known for his vividly-colored Arcadian landscapes which give away a strong devotion to his native Dubrovnik.

He obtained a degree in Art History from Belgrade University in the 1970s.

In 2006 a documentary was filmed about Ligorio entitled Dubrovački likovni umjetnici : Loren Ligorio.

References

External links
 Loren Ligorio's homepage with a gallery.

1955 births
People from Dubrovnik
Croatian painters
Modern painters
Living people
University of Belgrade alumni